The Big Flag (French: Le grand pavois) is a 1954 French drama film directed by Jacques Pinoteau and starring Jean Chevrier, Marc Cassot and Marie Mansart. It was shot at the Photosonor Studios in Paris. The film's sets were designed by the art director René Moulaert. Location shooting took place on board the French cruiser Jeanne d'Arc at Brest.

Synopsis
The plot follows the crew of a French Navy warship, and one of the officers who tries to adjust to civilian life but ends up returning to the sea. A theme is that of sailor's wives wanting them to build a life ashore, and their instinct to return to the sea.

Cast
 Jean Chevrier as Le lieutenant de marine Jean Favrel
 Marc Cassot as 	L'élève officier de marine Pierre Hardouin
 Marie Mansart as 	Simone Favrel
 Nicole Courcel as 	Madeleine
 Raphaël Patorni as 	Chéruel
 François Patrice as 	Derval
 Roger Crouzet as 	Ferrand
 Jean-Pierre Mocky as 	Luc Dutoit - un midship
 Jean Murat as Le capitaine Jabert
 Raymond Hermantier as	Leduc
 Micheline Gary as Françoise Aubry
 Jean Lanier as Paul Aubry
 Nicole Besnard as 	Corinne
 Marie d'Hyvert as 	Monique
 Bernard Dhéran as 	Lucien Barré
 Jean Gaven as Le lieutenant Lachenal
 Maurice Sarfati as 	Un midship
 Yves Brainville as 	Un lieutenant
 André Carnège as	Le ministre

References

Bibliography
 Lemonier, Marc. Guide des lieux cultes du cinéma en France. Horay, 2005.
 Rège, Philippe. Encyclopedia of French Film Directors, Volume 1. Scarecrow Press, 2009.

External links 
 

1954 films
1954 drama films
French drama films
1950s French-language films
Films directed by Jacques Pinoteau
Seafaring films
Films set in Brittany
1950s French films